Amirabad (also Romanized as Amīrābād) is a village in Hamzehlu Rural District, in the Central District of Khomeyn County, Markazi Province, Iran. At the 2006 census, its population was 131, in 36 families.

References 

Populated places in Khomeyn County